Kurumbalakotta (Malayalam: കുറുമ്പാലക്കോട്ട) is a hill 20Km west of Kalpetta in Wayanad district, Kerala. It is a monolith hillock in Kerala. It rises to 991 m (3251.31234 feet) above sea level. It is situated in the centre of Wayanad and also a part of Deccan plateau and the confluence of Western Ghats and Eastern Ghats. From the hill top, one can see the full scenery of Wayanad plateau. Misty mountains and valleys around the hill gives a pleasant atmosphere for trekkers.

The hill is located in Kottathara Panchayth of Vythiri Thaluk Wayanad district. Venniyode is the nearby small town. Tourists may reach by road from Kalpetta through Kamblakkad junction.

Geography of Wayanad district
Hills of Kerala